Bogutovac is a village and spa located in the municipality of Kraljevo, central Serbia. In the village there are mineral water springs. As of 2011 census, it has a population of 448 inhabitants.

Bogutovac is mentioned briefly in Michael Moore's hit film Bowling for Columbine.

See also
 List of spa towns in Serbia

References

Populated places in Raška District
Spa towns in Serbia